The Saint Petersburg–Hiitola railway is a  long railway with  broad gauge located in St. Petersburg, Leningrad Oblast (Karelian Isthmus) and Republic of Karelia, which links Finlyandsky Rail Terminal to Khiytola through Devyatkino, Vaskelovo, Sosnovo, Priozersk and Kuznechnoye. Originally built by Finnish State Railways in the Grand Duchy of Finland, the railway was part of a trunk line from Vaasa by the Gulf of Botnia to St. Petersburg. In the 1940 Moscow Peace Treaty the territory was ceded by Finland to the Soviet Union. The railroad is now operated by the Russian Railways. The railroad is used by passenger trains between St. Petersburg and Sortavala. The track between Khiytola and Sortavala is a part of the Vyborg–Joensuu railroad completed in 1894.

As the Russian part of the Riihimäki–Saint Petersburg railway is planned to be renovated to handle high-speed international trains operated by Karelian Trains and to be used exclusively for passenger traffic, so the cargo traffic between Finland and Russia—mostly lumber, granite rubble and oil—is expected to be switched to the Saint Petersburg–Hiitola railroad. This would make the railway a part of the Northern East-West Freight Corridor.

History
The railway connected Hiitola (Khiytola) on the Vyborg–Joensuu railway with Finland Station in St. Petersburg, bypassing the Riihimäki–Vyborg–Saint Petersburg trunk line of Finnish railways. Construction of the railway had been completed by January 1917, although some works continued until 1919. The line was constructed from Rautu (Sosnovo) to Hiitola, as single line railway which is used in both directions. The part of the railway south of Raasuli (Orekhovo) was on the Russian side of the Finnish-Russian border.

In 1918, after Finnish independence and during the Finnish Civil War, communications between Finland and Soviet Russia ceased. In spring 1918, troops under Georg Elfvengren blew up the track to prevent supplies reaching Red Guard units operating near Rautu. The Leningrad – Lembolovo part became part of NKPS Soviet Railways 1919 - 1939. This section was operated by at first by Nikolai Railway and later, after name change, the October Railway.

In 1940, after the Winter War and again in 1944 after the Continuation War the Karelian Isthmus with the railway was ceded to the Soviet Union in the Moscow Peace Treaty, Moscow Armistice and Paris Peace Treaty.

In 1939, as the war had begun, the population along the railway was evacuated, mostly to Pieksämäki. In 1941 some of them returned. In June 1944 during the final stages of the Continuation War, a train of Karelian evacuees was bombed by the Soviet Air Force in Petäjärvi.

The second parallel track between Sosnovo and Losevo, which is expected to be linked to Kamennogorsk and Vyborg, has been under construction since 2008 to handle the increasing freight traffic bypassing the connection between Saint Petersburg and Vyborg.

Railway stations

The construction year and original Finnish/Karelian name are given in brackets. Stops of the diesel-engined train are bolded.

Saint Petersburg – Finlyandsky Rail Terminal (1870) 
Kushelevka (1912) as a freight terminal from so called Connection Line. 
Piskaryovka (Piskarjevka, 1914) 
Ruchyi (Rutshi, 1917) 
Murino (Muurola)
Devyatkino (Vanha Miina, 1917) 
Lavriki (Suur Laurikkala. 1932)
Kapitolovo (Kopittara, 1957) 
Kuzmolovo (Kuismala, 1929)
Toksovo (Toksava / Toksova, 1917) 
Kavgolovo (Kaukola, 1929)
Oselki (Osselki / Osselkä, 1929)
Peri (1924) 
39th km (Lieskola)
Gruzino (Rokansaari, 1917). Branch line to Zavodskoy (Kuivaisi). 
47th km (Varsala)
Vaskelovo (Juskela, 1917) 
54th km Lembolovo (Lempäälä) (Orimäki, 1916)  ( after the station, railway reached to former Finnish/Russian border)
Orekhovo / Orehovo (Raasuli, 1916)  
67th km (Nuijala)
69th km (Kelliö)
Sosnovo (1916, Rautu) ex VR station 
78th km (Mäkrä, now Razdolye )
Petyayarvi (1916, Petäjärvi) 
Losevo (1916, Kiviniemi)
Gromovo (1916, Sakkola) 
Sukhodolye (1916, Haitermaa)
Otradnoye (1916, Pyhäjärvi) 
Myullyupelto (1916, Myllypelto) 
Sinyovo (1916, Näpinlahti)
Priozersk (1916, Käkisalmi) 
148th km (Granitnoye) (1916, Kapisalmi)
152nd km (Bogatyri) (1916, Paukkunen)
Kuznechnoye (1916, Kaarlahti) {convert|160|km}}
159th km
168th km, Kulikovo (1892, Kirkko Hiitola)
Khiytola (1892, Hiitola)

Electrification

1951: Finlyandskiy Rail Terminal – Piskaryovka
1958: Piskaryovka – Peri
1959: Peri – Vaskelovo
1959: Vaskelovo – Sosnovo
1975: Sosnovo – Priozersk
1976: Priozersk – Kuznechnoye

Finnish statistics for Hiitola–Raasuli–Border line
Public Timetable 1938:
Vaavoja  stopping place
Veijala  platform switch
Kopsala  stopping place in 1944 timetable
Sirsjärvi  stopping place
Suokkala  stopping place
Rajasuo  stopping place in 1944 timetable
Viiksanlahti  stopping place
Suvantola  stopping place
Mäkrä  stopping place
Raasuli border  from Rautu.

Branches
The Finlyandsky Rail Terminal also serves the railroads heading toward Zelenogorsk and Vyborg, among others. Further, after Piskaryovka, the road branches into three ways, two others heading south and east. After Murino there is a link to Pargolovo (Vyborg direction), along which a section of the Saint Petersburg Ring Road has been constructed.

By 1930 in Finland a railroad linking Viipuri (Vyborg), Heinjoki (Veshchevo), Ristseppälä (Zhitkovo) and Valkjärvi (Michurinskoye) had been built, which was expected to be continued to Rautu (Sosnovo). The Russians started to build the missing section between Rautu and Valkjärvi. The up grade from River Saija would have been more than 15 pro mille. That was too much for this proposed line and the project was cancelled. In August 1941,  of the track bed had been completed by the Russians. The remainder of this section was never completed. However, in the 1950s Soviet authorities demolished the track between Zhitkovo and Michurinskoye, but the track bed remains, and the rails between Veshchevo and Zhitkovo were also dismantled in 2001. However, the roadbed from Veshchevo to Sosnovo has remained until now.

At Käkisalmi was a short industrial  broad gauge railway to the German-owned Waldhof Cellulose Factory. This line was connected with VR built short Käkisalmi Harbour Line.

As of 2007, projects are being discussed to construct a cargo railway along the northern shore of the Vuoksi River from Losevo to Kamennogorsk to ship crude oil to the sea port of Primorsk bypassing the Saint Petersburg – Vyborg line. An alternative is reconstruction of the Sosnovo – Michurinskoye – Zhitkovo – Vyborg railway.

The old Karelian railroad links Vyborg and Kamennogorsk (in turn linked by railway to Imatra, Finland) to Hiitola.

Besides, a number of short military and industrial railways a few km long branch off from this line, e.g. a track between Orekhovo and Lembolovo westwards to Steklyannyi (Riskanmäki), between Gruzino and 47th km eastwards, between Otradnoye and Myllypelto westwards. At Priozersk eastwards to the Priozersk Pulp and Paper Mill, (former Waldhof Factory), as well as at Kuznechnoye (Kaarlahti) to the shore of Lake Ladoga) harbour.

Trains

The railway is used to ship petroleum to the ports of the Gulf of Finland through Hiitola, lumber and iron ore pellets from Karelia, as well as granite rubble from Kuznechnoye. Besides, it is a popular passenger line.

Passenger trains

Electric
(elektrichkas)
Saint Petersburg – Vaskelovo (about 1 h 25 min with all stops as of 2007)
Saint Petersburg – Sosnovo (about 2 h with all stops as of 2007)
Saint Petersburg – Priozersk (about 2 h 50 min with all stops as of 2007)
Saint Petersburg – Kuzhechnoye (about 3 h 25 min with all stops as of 2007)
Devyatkino – Vaskelovo (about 50 min with all stops as of 2007)
Devyatkino – Sosnovo (about 1 h 20 min with all stops as of 2007)
Kuznechnoye – Sortavala (about 25 min from Kuznechnoye to Hiitola with all stops as of 2007)

Diesel-engined
Saint Petersburg (Ladozhsky Rail Terminal) – Hiitola – Sortavala – Kostomuksha (about 3 h 35 m from Saint Petersburg to Hiitola)

Accidents

In 1983 in Sosnovo there was a cargo train crash resulting in a large oil spill.

See also
Vyborg-Joensuu railway

References
VR History 1862 - 1937, Helsinki 1937

External links

Вокзалы и станции Приозерского направления (Stations on the Priozersk railway)  Images

Railway lines in Russia
Former railway lines in Finland
Karelia
Rail transport in Leningrad Oblast
Karelian Isthmus
Finland–Soviet Union relations
1520 mm gauge railways in Russia
5 ft gauge railways in Finland